Paul Erik Olofsson Carlgren (born 4 December 1946) is a retired Swedish sprinter. He was part of Swedish teams that placed seventh in the 4 × 400 m relay at the 1972 Olympics and 1971 and 1974 European Championships. At the 1974 European Championships he also finished seventh in the individual 400 m event.

References

External links
 

1946 births
Living people
Athletes (track and field) at the 1972 Summer Olympics
Swedish male sprinters
Olympic athletes of Sweden
Sportspeople from Malmö
20th-century Swedish people